James Jacob Cline (March 2, 1899 – July 19, 1969) was an American football coach.  He served as the head football coach at the Southern Branch of the University of California—now known as the University of California, Los Angeles (UCLA)—from 1923 to 1924, comping a record of 2–10–3.

Cline graduated from Pomona High School in Pomona, California, before attending the University of California, Berkeley, where he played for the California Golden Bears under head coach Andy Smith.  He was later president of Cline Hardwood Co. in Los Angeles, where he died on July 19, 1969.

Head coaching record

References

External links
 

1899 births
1969 deaths
California Golden Bears football players
UCLA Bruins football coaches
People from Fremont County, Iowa
Sportspeople from Pomona, California
Players of American football from  California